Chris Bridge (5 July 1984) is a former professional rugby league footballer who played as a  and  in the 2000s and 2010s. 

He played for the Bradford Bulls, Warrington Wolves and the Widnes Vikings in the Super League, and on loan from Warrington at the Swinton Lions in the Championship. He played at international level for Ireland and England.

Background
Bridge was born in Oldham, Greater Manchester, England.

Playing career

Club career

Huddersfield Giants
He was in the youth system of the Huddersfield Giants.

Bradford Bulls
Bridge began his career with the Bradford Bulls.

Warrington Wolves

He had 10 successful seasons with Warrington Wolves. He started the 2008 campaign in superb form, scoring two tries; ultimately being Warrington's first try scorer of the 2008 season. However, during the second match of the season, away to St Helens, he was carried off with a ruptured achilies tendon.

He played in the 2013 Super League Grand Final defeat by the Wigan Warriors at Old Trafford.

Widnes Vikings
It was confirmed on 14 July 2015 that Bridge signed a two-year deal to play for Widnes Vikings from the start of the 2016 Super League season.

In June 2017, Bridge announced he would be retiring at the end of the season.

International career

Ireland
He was named in the Ireland training squad for the 2008 Rugby League World Cup.

England
In November 2010 he opted out of representing England in the Four Nations due to his wife Kirsten Kimberlee giving birth to their first child, Anais Elise.

He was selected to play for England against France in the one-off test in 2010.

References

External links

Widnes Vikings profile
(archived by web.archive.org) Profile at warringtonwolves.org

1984 births
Living people
Bradford Bulls players
England national rugby league team players
English people of Irish descent
English rugby league players
Ireland national rugby league team players
Rugby league centres
Rugby league five-eighths
Rugby league players from Oldham
Swinton Lions players
Warrington Wolves players
Widnes Vikings players